Hreinn Halldórsson (born 3 March 1949) is an Icelandic former track and field athlete who competed in the shot put.

He twice represented his country at the Summer Olympics and was the gold medallist at the European Athletics Indoor Championships in 1977 (Iceland's first medallist at the competition).

Career
Halldórsson was affiliated with KR Reykjavík sports club during his career. He won several national titles in his career, including straight titles from 1975 to 1981.

His first major competition was the 1974 European Athletics Championships, but the 25-year-old Halldórsson  failed to make it out of the qualifying round. After a ninth-place finish at the 1976 European Athletics Indoor Championships, he entered the 1976 Summer Olympics, where he came 15th in the qualifying round. He topped the podium at the 1977 European Athletics Indoor Championships, taking the first and only continental gold medal of his career. This made him the first Icelandic medallist and champion of the competition and he remains he only male to have topped the podium (Vala Flosadóttir won the women's pole vault in 1996).

Halldórsson was unable to translate his indoor win to an outdoor one at the 1978 European Athletics Championships, placing eighth. His season's best of  again ranked him in the top five globally. There were no major events for him to aim for in the 1979 season, but his throw of  that year ranked him in the global top ten. His highest placing at a world-level event came at the 1980 Moscow Olympics, where he threw  in qualifying, then  in the final for tenth place. The latter performance was a metre down on his best that season. In his final top level international competition he was sixth at the 1981 European Athletics Indoor Championships.

International competitions

References

External links

Living people
1949 births
Hreinn Halldorsson
Hreinn Halldorsson
Athletes (track and field) at the 1976 Summer Olympics
Athletes (track and field) at the 1980 Summer Olympics